Botany Downs is an eastern suburb of the city of Auckland, New Zealand. This residential area previously formed part of the East Tāmaki area. 

In terms of  local-body administration, the suburb lies in the Howick ward, one of the thirteen administrative divisions of the Auckland Council. Since , a general electorate, has reflected the name of the suburb.

Demographics

Botany Downs had a population of 5,154 at the 2018 New Zealand census, an increase of 294 people (6.0%) since the 2013 census, and an increase of 354 people (7.4%) since the 2006 census. There were 1,680 households, comprising 2,496 males and 2,658 females, giving a sex ratio of 0.94 males per female, with 975 people (18.9%) aged under 15 years, 921 (17.9%) aged 15 to 29, 2,457 (47.7%) aged 30 to 64, and 804 (15.6%) aged 65 or older.

Ethnicities were 60.5% European/Pākehā, 5.1% Māori, 3.1% Pacific peoples, 35.2% Asian, and 3.6% other ethnicities. People may identify with more than one ethnicity.

The percentage of people born overseas was 49.4, compared with 27.1% nationally.

Although some people chose not to answer the census's question about religious affiliation, 46.6% had no religion, 39.3% were Christian, 0.2% had Māori religious beliefs, 2.4% were Hindu, 1.3% were Muslim, 1.9% were Buddhist and 2.2% had other religions.

Of those at least 15 years old, 1,188 (28.4%) people had a bachelor's or higher degree, and 504 (12.1%) people had no formal qualifications. 906 people (21.7%) earned over $70,000 compared to 17.2% nationally. The employment status of those at least 15 was that 2,253 (53.9%) people were employed full-time, 525 (12.6%) were part-time, and 120 (2.9%) were unemployed.

Economy

Retail

The Botany Town Centre shopping precinct opened in 2001. It was expanded to 62,700 m² in 2019. It has 200 stores including Farmers, New World, Hoyts and Whitcoulls. Outside the shopping centre, there is also Pak'nSave, The Warehouse, Torpedo7 and Noel leeming (all owned by The Warehouse Group) as well as Briscoes and Rebel Sport (both owned by Briscoe Group).

Education

All these schools are coeducational. Rolls are as of 

The main secondary schools for the area are Botany Downs Secondary College and Howick College

References

External links
Botany Library
Photographs of Botany Downs held in Auckland Libraries' heritage collections.

Suburbs of Auckland
Howick Local Board Area